Iryna Charnushenka-Stasiuk (9 March 1979 – 5 December 2013) was a Belarusian long jumper. She was born in Slutsk, Minsk Region. Charnushenka-Stasiuk represented Belarus at the 2008 Summer Olympics in Beijing, where she competed for the women's long jump, along with her compatriot Volha Siarheyenka. She performed the best jump of 6.48 metres in her first attempt, despite having received two fouls throughout the entire qualifying round. Charnushenka-Stasiuk, however, failed to advance into the final, as she placed eighteenth out of forty-two athletes in the overall rankings. On December 5, 2013 she died of cancer at the age of 34.

References

External links

NBC Olympics Profile

1979 births
2013 deaths
Belarusian female long jumpers
Olympic athletes of Belarus
Athletes (track and field) at the 2008 Summer Olympics
People from Slutsk
Deaths from cancer in Belarus
Sportspeople from Minsk Region